Authigenesis is the process whereby a mineral or sedimentary rock deposit is generated where it is found or observed.  Such deposits are described as authigenic.  Authigenic sedimentary minerals form during sedimentation by precipitation or recrystallization instead of being transported from elsewhere (allogenic) by water or wind. Authigenic sediments are the main constituents of deep sea sedimentation. Authigenic clays tend to reduce the porosity of sediments, thus reducing permeability.

In metamorphic petrology an authigenic mineral is one formed in situ during metamorphism, again by precipitation from fluids or recrystallization.

For any mineral to be precipitated, the water must be supersaturated with respect to that mineral.  For calcite, this means that the area of deposition must be above the carbonate compensation depth, or that the pore waters are sufficiently saturated due to dissolution of other grains that precipitation can begin.  The alkalinity can also be reduced by microbial sulfate reduction.

Common authigenic minerals in sedimentary rocks

calcium carbonate
apatite
clays
hematite
limonite
chamosite
siderite
silica
glauconite
pyrite

See also
 Neomorphism

References

External links
 Authigenic Sediments

Mineralogy
Sedimentology